Ray Wartman (29 January 1915 – 20 April 2008) was an Australian rules footballer who played with Melbourne in the VFL.

Football
Wartman played with the Whorouly Football Club in the Ovens & King Football League in the early 1930s and commenced with his VFA career with the Camberwell Football Club in late 1932 during the final series. Wartman was cleared to Whorouly in early 1933. Wartman then returned to Camberwell in 1934, before commencing with Melbourne in 1935, winning the Best First Year Player award.

A wingman, Wartman was a member of Melbourne's successful side in the late 1930s and early 1940s. Wartman played in three consecutive premierships with Melbourne, in 1939, 1940, and 1941.

Athletics
Wartman won the 1937 Castlemaine Gift, which elevated him as one of the pre-race favourites for the Stawell Gift, but he came second in his heat.

Golf
Wartman made the semi finals of the 1954 Victorian Amateur Golf Championships.

In 1955, Huntingdale Golf Club pair Bob Bull and Ray Wartman won the Australasian Foursomes Shield.

Notes

External links

 Ray Wartman, at The VFA Project.

1915 births
2008 deaths
Australian male sprinters
Australian rules footballers from Victoria (Australia)
Australian Rules footballers: place kick exponents
Melbourne Football Club players
Camberwell Football Club players
Melbourne Football Club Premiership players
Three-time VFL/AFL Premiership players